The Shit Creek Review is an online literary and art magazine (webzine or e-zine). Its content is mostly related to poetry, and includes work belonging the differing styles of formalism and free verse by established authors and new writers. It draws on the authors and resources of a number of online poetry forums, such as Eratosphere and The Gazebo.

History 

It was founded by Australian poet Paul Stevens in 2006, who was soon joined by Nigel Holt and Angela France, who also edits the U.K. print magazine iota as its poetry editors, Don Zirilli as its art editor, and Patricia Wallace Jones as artist-in-residence. The journal is archived by the National Library of Australia.

The e-zine was originally started by Stevens as a joke based on its name Shit Creek Review, which is a not-so-subtle ironic allusion to the many literary magazines which use the formulaic title "X Creek (or River) Review", as well as incorporating a play on the Australian colloquialism "Up Shit Creek in a barbed wire canoe without a paddle" (to be in serious difficulties), made famous by Australian comedian Barry Humphries through his persona of the ocker "Barry McKenzie".

Paul Stevens chief-edited the first ten issues until health problems caused him to step down in late 2009, replaced by Rose Kelleher. Editors Patricia Wallace Jones and Don Zirilli also left the editorial team at this time. Holt, Kelleher and France co-edited issues 11 and 12, Holt subsequently leaving the team; Kelleher, Angela France and Paul Stevens co-edited issue 13, and Kelleher and France were joined by Ann Drysdale and R. Nemo Hill as co-editors for issue 14. Kelleher relinquished the post of editor in July, 2011, and Stevens resumed chief-editing for issue 14 (December, 2011), rejoined by original editorial team members Zirilli and Jones, who, along with Angela France and Ann Drysdale, produced the "End of Days" themed issue 14. It is uncertain whether there will be future issues of the journal.

Style

The Shit Creek Review combines poetry with art which seeks to reflect somehow the content or feel of the poem. The look and layout changes fairly comprehensively from issue to issue, so there is no real continuity of visual style, apart from the fact that each new issue seems to create a new self-contained narrative appropriate to its theme. Much of the poetry uses the traditional forms of New Formalism, though there is also a strong representation of Free Verse.

The Shit Creek Review also publishes reviews and articles from time to time. Rose Kelleher's essay on 'Edgy vs. Nice' attracted the interest of The Guardian's Tim Radford. Kelleher's book, Bundle o' Tinder, published by Waywiser Press, includes many poems first published in The Shit Creek Review; the book was selected for the 2007 Anthony Hecht Poetry Prize by Richard Wilbur. Publication in The Shit Creek Review is frequently cited by poets such as Larry L. Fontenot, Rachel Bunting, Kirk Knesset, John Milbury-Steen, Janet Kenny, Tammy Ho, Julie Carter, Eve Anthony Hanninen, Robert Clawson, C.P. Stewart, and many others.

Blog 

Information about The Shit Creek Review can be found on The Shit Creek Review Blog, where serious and less serious discussions of literary and other matters take place, as well as links to poetry and art-related sites of interest.

The Chimaera

The Shit Creek Review spawned a subzine called II which was somewhat more text-based (rather than emphasising the art component). In October, 2007, II was detached from The Shit Creek Review and renamed The Chimaera, now edited by Paul Stevens and Peter Bloxsom of NetPublish. The Chimaera is a literary miscellany, publishing verse, short stories, articles, essays and interviews with prominent or rising poets, including Alison Brackenbury, John Whitworth (poet), R.S. Gwynn and Stephen Edgar.

Notable Contributors 
The Shit Creek Review has published poets from the U.K., U.S. and Australia, including:

 Nicolette Bethel 
 Alison Brackenbury
 Maryann Corbett 
 Louie Crew 
 Denise Duhamel
 Rhina Espaillat
 Andrew Frisardi
 M. A. Griffiths
 R.S. Gwynn
 Bill Knott
 J. Patrick Lewis 
 Kei Miller
 Kevin Andrew Murphy
 Timothy Murphy
 Lee Passarella
 Craig Raine
 Charlotte Runcie
 A.E. Stallings
 Wendy Videlock 
 Richard Wakefield
 John Whitworth
 Kirby Wright
 Peter Wyton

Related E-zines

Paul Stevens also edits a "metaphysicalzine" called The Flea (after John Donne's poem of that name), which publishes poetry loosely in the Metaphysical Poetry tradition. Peter Bloxsom publishes an online journal devoted to the Sonnet form, called 14 by 14.

Paul Stevens died in March 2013. As at September 2015 the three online journal sites remain inactive. No new content has been added since 2011, so as they stand these are archives. They will remain online as long as possible. Should any of them cease to be available at their current URLs, they will be accessible indefinitely thanks to archives maintained by the Australian National Library in its Pandora system, http://pandora.nla.gov.au/. The “mirror” sites are good but not perfect — there are some technical and graphic features which they do not correctly reflect. 

The online literary journal Angle (http://anglepoetry.co.uk/) publishes mainly poetry, on an annual cycle, in PDF format. Its founding Editor, Philip Quinlan (originally supported by Janet Kenny) was an admirer of the Paul Stevens journals. His taste is similar and Angle can be considered as more or less in the line of descent. It publishes poets from all over the planet, as did The Chimaera, The Shit Creek Review and The Flea.

References

External links
 http://shitcreek.auszine.com
 http://shitcreek.auszine.com/author-index/
 http://theshitcreekreview.blogspot.com/
 http://www.the-chimaera.com/
 http://the-chimaera.blogspot.com/
 http://www.the-flea.com/
http://www.14by14.com/
 Nic Sebastian interviews Paul Stevens

2006 establishments in Australia
Literary magazines published in Australia
Australian literature websites
Magazines established in 2006
Poetry literary magazines